Glareana is a biannual academic journal covering topics related to musical instruments, ranging from historical and critical musicology to theory and organology, ethnomusicology, and music iconographical studies. The journal is published by the Gesellschaft der Freunde alter Musikinstrumente.

Abstracting and indexing 
The journal is abstracted and indexed in Répertoire International de Littérature Musicale and  Bibliographie des Musikschrifttums.

External links 
 

Publications established in 1951
Music journals
Biannual journals
Multilingual journals
Academic journals published by learned and professional societies